David Roy Gavitt (October 26, 1937 – September 16, 2011) was an American college basketball coach and athletic director at Providence College in Providence, Rhode Island. He was also well known as the first commissioner of the Big East Conference and as part of the committee which created the 1992 Olympic basketball "Dream Team".

Coaching career
Raised in Westerly, Rhode Island and Peterborough, New Hampshire, Gavitt graduated from Dartmouth College in 1959, where he was a member of the 1959–1960 varsity basketball team, the last Dartmouth basketball team to win the Ivy League championship. While an undergraduate at Dartmouth in 1958, Gavitt played summer collegiate baseball for the Orleans Cardinals of the Cape Cod Baseball League (CCBL). He later became player-manager of the CCBL's Harwich Mariners, then returned to Orleans as manager in 1963–64 and 1966–67.

Gavitt spent two years as an assistant basketball coach at Worcester Academy before becoming an assistant coach at Providence under the legendary Joe Mullaney in 1962. He left in 1966 to become assistant coach and then head coach at his alma mater before taking over for Mullaney at Providence in 1969.

Under his ten-year tenure, the Friars advanced to the postseason eight straight years (1971–78; five NCAA appearances, 1972–'74, '77–'78, and three NIT appearances, 1971, '75, 76). In 1973, Gavitt's team made it to the Final Four for the first time in school history. He also served as director of athletics at PC from 1971 to 1982, and was at that position when the school's women's athletics programs were started as a result of Title IX.

The Big East, USA Basketball and beyond
In 1979, Gavitt, along with several other college athletics administrators, helped to form the Big East Conference as a means to better compete with the major schools in the country. He became the conference's first commissioner, from 1979 to 1990. Under his direction, the Big East steadily expanded and was an almost immediate success, as several schools became basketball powerhouses (culminating in the 1985 Final Four, in which three schools from the conference – Georgetown, Saint John's, and eventual champion Villanova – were present).

During his tenure, six of the conference's schools (Georgetown, Villanova, Saint John's, Providence, Seton Hall and Syracuse) participated in the Final Four, and all nine teams made it to the NCAA tournament at least once. His contributions are memorialized  in the Dave Gavitt Trophy, given to the winner of the Big East's men's basketball tournament, which he was responsible for not only creating, but its annual use of Madison Square Garden. Also, from 1982 to 1984, he was chairman of the NCAA Division I Basketball Committee. It was under his guidance that the tournament expanded to 64 teams, in order to provide better opportunity for small conference teams to participate. He was also responsible for the playing of Final Four games in larger venues such as domed stadiums, and the first full contract with a television network to provide universal coverage of the tournament, further adding to the tournament's popularity and prestige.

Gavitt has also been involved in Olympic basketball. In 1980, he was selected as the head coach of the Olympic basketball team, only to lose out on the opportunity due to the boycott of the Moscow games by the United States. He would also go on to serve on the Olympic governing body, including a presidency from 1988 to 1992. It was during his tenure that he developed the concept of the "Dream Team," an Olympic basketball team composed of the NBA's best.

Besides these responsibilities, Gavitt was CEO of the Boston Celtics from 1990 to 1994, President of the NCAA Foundation from 1995 to 1997, and Chairman of the Board of the Naismith Memorial Basketball Hall of Fame until 2003. He is a member of the Providence College Athletic Hall of Fame (1984), National Association of Collegiate Directors of Athletics Hall of Fame (2000), and the International Scholar-Athlete Hall of Fame (2000). Gavitt was inducted into the Basketball Hall of Fame on September 8, 2006. He became the third former member of the Friar athletic program (after John Thompson and Lenny Wilkens), and the first native of Rhode Island to be enshrined. The Providence Friars' court at the Dunkin' Donuts Center is named after Gavitt.

Death
Gavitt died on September 16, 2011, from congestive heart failure in a hospital near his hometown of Rumford, Rhode Island. He was 73.

Head coaching record

See also
 List of NCAA Division I Men's Final Four appearances by coach

References

External links
 

1937 births
2011 deaths
American men's basketball coaches
American men's basketball players
Basketball coaches from Rhode Island
Basketball players from Rhode Island
Big East Conference commissioners
Boston Celtics executives
Cape Cod Baseball League coaches
Cape Cod Baseball League players (pre-modern era)
College men's basketball head coaches in the United States
Dartmouth Big Green baseball players
Dartmouth Big Green men's basketball coaches
Dartmouth Big Green men's basketball players
Harwich Mariners players
High school basketball coaches in the United States
Naismith Memorial Basketball Hall of Fame inductees
National Basketball Association executives
National Collegiate Basketball Hall of Fame inductees
Orleans Firebirds players
People from Westerly, Rhode Island
Providence Friars athletic directors
Providence Friars men's basketball coaches
United States men's national basketball team coaches